Laurence Kaapama (15 September 1983 - c. 10 August 2013) was a Namibian football defender. He played for Dynamos FC and the Namibian national team.

Death
Kaapama died about 10 August 2013. No information has been made public but it is suspected to be due to an asthma attack.

Clubs
 Hotflames Windhoek
 Dynamos FC

References

External links

1983 births
2013 deaths
Namibian men's footballers
Namibia international footballers
Namibian expatriate footballers
Namibian expatriate sportspeople in South Africa
African Stars F.C. players
Expatriate soccer players in South Africa
Association football defenders
Dynamos F.C. (South Africa) players
Deaths from asthma